Pareuxesta is a genus of picture-winged flies in the family Ulidiidae.

Species
 Pareuxesta academica
 Pareuxesta hyalinata
 Pareuxesta latifasciata
 Pareuxesta obscura
 Pareuxesta xanthomera

References

Ulidiidae
Muscomorpha genera
Taxa named by Daniel William Coquillett